Wang Wei (born 15 February 1977), is a Chinese former ice hockey player who played at the 1998 Winter Olympics where China finished 4th. She also won a gold medal at the 1999 Asian Winter Games.

References

1977 births
Living people
Chinese women's ice hockey players
Ice hockey players at the 1998 Winter Olympics
Olympic ice hockey players of China
Sportspeople from Harbin
Asian Games gold medalists for China
Ice hockey players at the 1999 Asian Winter Games
Medalists at the 1999 Asian Winter Games
Asian Games medalists in ice hockey